The 1949 Kategoria e Dytë is the sixth season of the second tier of football in Albania. The season took over from the annulled 1948–49 campaign which was ended on 31 March 1949, and the 1949 campaign began on 22 May and finished in October.

First round

Group 1

Peshkopia won the group and advanced to the next round

Group 2

Kukësi won the group and advanced to the next round

Group 3

Kopliku and Lezha advanced to the next round

Group 4

No clubs from Group 4 advanced to the next round

Group 5

NBSh Ylli Kuq Kamëz won the group and advanced to the next round

Group 6

Mbrostari won the group and advanced to the next round

Group 7

Berati, Patosi and Spartaku Kuçovë advanced to the next round

Group 8

Kolonja and Tepelena advanced to the next round

Group 9

Peqini won the group and advanced to the next round

Group 10

No clubs from Group 10 advanced to the next round

Group 11

No clubs from Group 11 advanced to the next round

Group 12

Himara won the group and advanced to the next round

Group 13

Delvina and Gjirokastra advanced to the next round

Second round
 Spartaku Pogradec
 Lezha
 Berati
 Peshkopia
 Kukësi
 Kopliku
 NBSh Ylli Kuq Kamë
 Mbrostari
 Patosi
 Spartaku Kuçovë
 Kolonja
 Tepelena
 Peqini
 Himara
 Delvina
 Gjirokastra
Spartaku Pogradec, Lezha and Berati advanced to the final round

Final round
 Spartaku Pogradec
 Lezha
 Berati
Spartaku Pogradec and Lezha finished on equal points, so they shared the title

References

Kategoria e Parë seasons
Albania
2